Men's ice hockey tournaments have been staged at the Olympic Games since 1920. The men's tournament was introduced at the 1920 Summer Olympics, and permanently added to the Winter Olympic Games in 1924. Slovakia has participated in 5 of 22 tournaments, sending 10 goaltenders and 61 skaters.

The Olympic Games were originally intended for amateur athletes, so the players of the National Hockey League (NHL) and other professional leagues were not allowed to compete. In 1986, the International Olympic Committee (IOC) voted to allow all athletes to compete in Olympic Games, starting in 1988.  The NHL decided not to allow all players to participate in 1988, 1992 or 1994, because doing so would force the league to halt play during the Olympics. An agreement was reached in 1995 that allowed NHL players to compete in the Olympics, starting with the 1998 Games in Nagano, Japan.  Slovak players were a part of the Czechoslovakia men's national ice hockey team until the dissolution of Czechoslovakia in 1993 separated the countries.  The Czech Republic men's national ice hockey team was considered the successor to Czechoslovakia, while Slovakia was treated as a "new" country for the purposes of the International Ice Hockey Federation, and forced to work its way up through the ranks.  Despite this, Slovakia qualified for the 1994 tournament, and finished in a respectable sixth place.  At the 2002 tournament, the preliminary round was scheduled without the participation of NHL players.  This negatively impacted the Slovakian team, which had a heavy reliance on NHL players; as a result, the team finished in 13th place in the tournament.  Today, however, Slovakia is considered one of the "Big Seven" hockey nations, and is a regular contender for a medal at international tournaments.  National teams are co-ordinated by Slovak Ice Hockey Federation and players are chosen by the team's management staff.

The Slovaks have not won a medal in an Olympic tournament.  Their best finish was in fourth place at the 2010 Games.  Peter Šťastný is the only Slovak player to have been inducted into the Hockey Hall of Fame and the IIHF Hall of Fame. Miroslav Šatan holds the record for most games played, having dressed for 22 games in 1994, 2002, 2006 and 2010; he and Ľubomír Višňovský are the only players to participate in four tournaments. Marián Hossa leads Slovak Olympians in goals (12) and points (25), while Pavol Demitra has 14 assists, more than any other player.

Key

Goaltenders

Reserve goaltenders
These goaltenders were named to the Olympic roster, but did not receive any ice time during games.  Pavol Rybár did not play in any games in the 1998 tournament, but did start games at later tournaments.  Peter Budaj and Rastislav Staňa were named to the team at the 2010 tournament, but did not play any games.

Skaters

See also
 Slovakia men's national ice hockey team

Notes

References

External links

 Slovak Ice Hockey Federation - Official website

ice hockey
Slovakia
Slovakia

Slovakia men's national ice hockey team